The Athletic Equipment Managers Association (AEMA) is a professional membership association for equipment managers who support the athletic equipment profession.

Founded in 1974, the AEMA has grown into a worldwide association of certified equipment managers at the professional, collegiate, and amateur level who work as a group to bring about equipment improvements for the greater safety of all participants in sport and recreation. Members of the AEMA enjoy the opportunity to meet their equipment colleagues at annual conventions, share ideas, and learn more efficient techniques to improve their workplace for their athletes, coaches, and support staff.

History 
The first documented original meeting was held in Atlanta, Georgia in June 1973. A committee was formed and the group was named The National Equipment Men's Association.

Membership started with 25 members in 1974 with Harry Yalocki as the first Executive Director and Tom Burton as the first President. Helen Sharp became the first Administrative Assistant manager and started the office with her husband, Glenn Sharp.

The first national organization meeting "Convention" was held in 1974 in Kansas City, Missouri where the name Athletic Equipment Managers Association was born and created. At this first convention, a formal Executive Board was found and Jon Falk was appointed the first National Membership chairman.

The AEMA continues to grow and evolve each year through national conventions and other network opportunities.

AEMA Mission Statement 
"We strive for the advancement, encouragement, and improvement of the profession for the greater safety of participants in all sports, while creating professional growth through research, education, innovation, commitment, and advancement for all members."

Certification 
AEMA Certification is the educational program that gives athletic equipment managers an accepted level of proficiency in the performance of their jobs through the proper recognition of specialized skills, knowledge, and experience in the athletic equipment management field. Scantron Corporation is contracted with the AEMA to develop a Certification Standard for Athletic Equipment Management and a Certification Exam is administered annually for members to take and become Certified Equipment Managers. Through a role delineation process, the following areas of job performance were identified and established for athletic equipment managers to be proficient in: Management, Administration, and Professional Development; Procurement; Accountability; Maintenance; Fitting and Safety.

Certification began in 1991 and is considered the standard for athletic equipment management which continues annually thru the Certification Exam. To maintain certified equipment manager status, each certified member must earn 6.0 CEUs (Continuing Education Units) every three years. This represents 60 contact hours in various forms of educational activities that help in the continuous improvement, development, and growth of the association.

Leadership and Committees 
Top Leadership includes the Executive Director, Associate Executive Director, President, Vice President, National Office Manager, Treasurer, Certification Chair, and the 9 District Directors.

Certification Steering Committee is led by a chairperson and covers the CEC, Education, Exam, and Program Committees.

Other committees are the Exhibits Committee, External Communications Committee, Lifetime Achievement Committee, NOCSAE Committee, and Scholarship Committee.

Districts 
The AEMA membership is divided into 9 districts that consist of District Directors (who each have a seat on the Executive Board with voting power) plus other leadership positions (such as Treasurer, Secretary, Social Media, etc.). Each district may host virtual or in-person meetings with workshops offering another way for certified members to earn CEUs.

District 1 -- United States: Connecticut, Maine, Massachusetts, New Hampshire, New Jersey, New York, Rhode Island, Vermont

Canada: Quebec, New Brunswick, Newfoundland, Nova Scotia

District 2 -- United States: Delaware, District of Columbia, Maryland, Pennsylvania, Virginia, West Virginia

District 3 -- United States: Alabama, Georgia, Florida, North Carolina, South Carolina

District 4 -- United States: Arkansas, Kentucky, Louisiana, Mississippi, Tennessee

District 5 -- United States: Illinois, Indiana, Michigan, Minnesota, Ohio, Wisconsin

Canada: Ontario

District 6 -- United States: Iowa, Kansas, Missouri, Nebraska, North Dakota, South Dakota

Canada: Manitoba

District 7 -- United States: Colorado, New Mexico, Oklahoma, Texas

District 8 -- United States: Idaho, Montana, Oregon, Utah, Washington, Wyoming

Canada: Alberta, British Columbia, Saskatchewan

District 9 -- United States: Alaska, Arizona, California, Hawaii, Nevada

Germany

Japan

Awards

Glenn Sharp Award 
The Glenn Sharp Award is the most prestigious award that the AEMA gives out each year at convention. It is given to the member who has made the most significant beneficial contributions to the AEMA. Candidates are nominated from each District then reviewed by the Board of Directors and past award winners before the three finalists are voted by all active AEMA members.

Lifetime Achievement Award 
The Lifetime Achievement Award is an honor given to individuals who have shown exceptional dedication to the AEMA by serving 15 or more years as a member and have distinguished themselves in the promotion and advancement of the association.

Booker Kilgore Award 
The Booker Kilgore Award is presented to the high school equipment manager who best exemplifies the character and service of the legendary Booker Kilgore.

Additional Awards 
A special recognition Service Award may be given to any member or non-member who has performed a service deemed above and beyond for the AEMA.

Each District is allowed to give out their own awards on an annual basis.

References

External links
https://equipmentmanagers.org/
Sports equipment
Sports professional associations based in the United States
Sports organizations established in 1974
Trade associations based in the United States
Sporting goods industry